jOrgan is a Java-based MIDI processor. It is free software for complex transmitting and dynamical modifying of MIDI messages on their way between MIDI encoders and MIDI decoders, through an own MIDI Programming Language MPL. It can be used as Virtual Pipe Organ (virtual organ console). Runs on Microsoft Windows, Linux and macOS operating systems.

Features 
 use a graphical user interface
 customize your disposition conveniently. Set your MIDI inputs and basic settings
 execute arbitrary commands
 utilize Creative soundcards specific features
 embed a Fluidsynth sampler in jOrgan
 conveniently configure LinuxSampler
 import elements from different sources
 Use a virtual keyboard
 connect to Midi devices on other computers with LAN devices
 show disposition information on an LCD
 store combinations in a memory
 merge MIDI devices
 record and share your performances
 connect stop action magnets (SAM) driven stop tabs with your disposition
 work with Soundfonts
 work with MIDI tools and utilities

External references 

MIDI
Java (programming language)